Helochara communis, the bog leafhopper, is a species of sharpshooter in the family Cicadellidae.

References

Further reading

External links

 

Insects described in 1851
Cicadellini